A Doll's House (Danish and ; also translated as A Doll House) is a three-act play written by Norwegian playwright Henrik Ibsen. It premiered at the Royal Theatre in Copenhagen, Denmark, on 21 December 1879, having been published earlier that month. The play is set in a Norwegian town circa 1879.

The play concerns the fate of a married woman, who at the time in Norway lacked reasonable opportunities for self-fulfillment in a male-dominated world, despite the fact that Ibsen denied it was his intent to write a feminist play. It was a great sensation at the time, and caused a "storm of outraged controversy" that went beyond the theatre to the world of newspapers and society.

In 2006, the centennial of Ibsen's death, A Doll's House held the distinction of being the world's most performed play that year. UNESCO has inscribed Ibsen's autographed manuscripts of A Doll's House on the Memory of the World Register in 2001, in recognition of their historical value.

The title of the play is most commonly translated as A Doll's House, though some scholars use A Doll House. John Simon says that A Doll's House is "the British term for what [Americans] call a 'dollhouse. Egil Törnqvist says of the alternative title: "Rather than being superior to the traditional rendering, it simply sounds more idiomatic to Americans."

List of characters

Nora Helmer – wife of Torvald, mother of three, is living out the ideal of the 19th-century wife, but leaves her family at the end of the play.
Torvald Helmer – Nora's husband, a newly promoted bank manager, professes to be enamoured of his wife but their marriage stifles her.
Dr. Rank – a rich family friend (named "Peter Rank" in Michael Meyer's translation). He is terminally ill, and it is implied that his "tuberculosis of the spine" originates from a venereal disease contracted by his father.
Kristine Linde – Nora's old school friend, widowed, is seeking employment (sometimes spelled Christine in English translations). She was in a relationship with Krogstad prior to the play's setting.
Nils Krogstad – an employee at Torvald's bank, a single father, he is pushed to desperation. A supposed scoundrel, he is revealed to be a long-lost lover of Kristine.
The Children – Nora and Torvald's children: Ivar, Bobby, and Emmy (in order of age).
Anne Marie – Nora's former nanny, who gave up her own daughter to "strangers" when she became, as she says, the only mother Nora knew.  She now cares for Nora's children.
Helene – the Helmers' maid.
The Porter – delivers a Christmas tree to the Helmer household at the beginning of the play.

Synopsis

Act One

The play opens at Christmas time as Nora Helmer enters her home carrying many packages. Nora's husband Torvald is working in his study when she arrives. He playfully rebukes her for spending so much money on Christmas gifts, calling her his "little squirrel." He teases her about how the previous year she had spent weeks making gifts and ornaments by hand because money was scarce. This year Torvald is due a promotion at the bank where he works, so Nora feels that they can let themselves go a little. The maid announces two visitors: Mrs. Kristine Linde, an old friend of Nora's, who has come seeking employment; and Dr. Rank, a close friend of the family, who is let into the study. Kristine has had a difficult few years, ever since her husband died leaving her with no money or children. Nora says that things have not been easy for them either: Torvald became sick, and they had to travel to Italy so he could recover. Kristine explains that when her mother was ill she had to take care of her brothers, but now that they are grown she feels her life is "unspeakably empty." Nora promises to talk to Torvald about finding her a job. Kristine gently tells Nora that she is like a child. Nora is offended, so she tells her that she got money from "some admirer" so they could travel to Italy to improve Torvald's health.  She told Torvald that her father gave her the money, but in fact she illegally borrowed it without his knowledge (women were forbidden from conducting financial activities such as signing checks without a man's endorsement). Since then, she has been secretly working and saving up to pay off the loan.

Krogstad, a lower-level employee at Torvald's bank, arrives and goes into the study. Nora is clearly uneasy when she sees him. Dr. Rank leaves the study and mentions that he feels wretched, though like everyone he wants to go on living. In contrast to his physical illness, he says that the man in the study, Krogstad, is "morally diseased."

After the meeting with Krogstad, Torvald comes out of the study. Nora asks him if he can give Kristine a position at the bank and Torvald is very positive, saying that this is a fortunate moment, as a position has just become available. Torvald, Kristine, and Dr. Rank leave the house, leaving Nora alone. The nanny returns with the children and Nora plays with them for a while until Krogstad creeps through the ajar door into the living room and surprises her. Krogstad tells Nora that Torvald intends to fire him from the bank and asks her to intercede with Torvald to allow him to keep his job. She refuses, and Krogstad  blackmails her about the loan she took out for the trip to Italy; he knows that she obtained this loan by forging her father's signature after his death. Krogstad leaves and when Torvald returns, Nora tries to convince him not to fire Krogstad. Torvald refuses to hear her pleas, explaining that Krogstad is a liar and a hypocrite and that years before he had committed a crime: he forged other people's signatures. Torvald feels physically ill in the presence of a man "poisoning his own children with lies and dissimulation."

Act Two
Kristine arrives to help Nora repair a dress for a costume function that she and Torvald plan to attend the next day. Torvald returns from the bank, and Nora pleads with him to reinstate Krogstad, claiming she is worried Krogstad will publish libelous articles about Torvald and ruin his career. Torvald dismisses her fears and explains that, although Krogstad is a good worker and seems to have turned his life around, he must be fired because he is too familiar around Torvald in front of other bank personnel. Torvald then retires to his study to work.

Dr. Rank, the family friend, arrives. Nora asks him for a favor, but Rank responds by revealing that he has entered the terminal stage of his disease and that he has always been secretly in love with her. Nora tries to deny the first revelation and make light of it but is more disturbed by his declaration of love. She then clumsily attempts to tell him that she is not in love with him, but loves him dearly as a friend.

Having been fired by Torvald, Krogstad arrives at the house. Nora convinces Dr. Rank to go into Torvald's study so he will not see Krogstad. When Krogstad confronts Nora, he declares that he no longer cares about the remaining balance of Nora's loan, but that he will instead preserve the associated bond to blackmail Torvald into not only keeping him employed but also promoting him. Nora explains that she has done her best to persuade her husband, but he refuses to change his mind. Krogstad informs Nora that he has written a letter detailing her crime (forging her father's signature of surety on the bond) and put it in Torvald's mailbox, which is locked.

Nora tells Kristine of her difficult situation, gives her Krogstad's card with his address, and asks her to try to convince him to relent.

Torvald enters and tries to retrieve his mail, but Nora distracts him by begging him to help her with the dance she has been rehearsing for the costume party, feigning anxiety about performing. She dances so badly and acts so childishly that Torvald agrees to spend the whole evening coaching her. When the others go to dinner, Nora stays behind for a few minutes and contemplates killing herself.

Act Three

Kristine tells Krogstad that she only married her husband because she had no other means to support her sick mother and young siblings and that she has returned to offer him her love again. She believes that he would not have stooped to unethical behavior if he had not been devastated by her abandonment and in dire financial straits. Krogstad changes his mind and offers to take back his letter from Torvald. However, Kristine decides that Torvald should know the truth for the sake of his and Nora's marriage.

After Torvald literally drags Nora home from the party, Rank follows them. They chat for a while, with Dr. Rank conveying obliquely to Nora that this is a final goodbye, as he has determined that his death is near. Dr. Rank leaves, and Torvald retrieves his letters. As he reads them, Nora prepares to run away for good, but Torvald confronts her with Krogstad's letter. Enraged, he declares that he is now completely in Krogstad's power; he must yield to Krogstad's demands and keep quiet about the whole affair. He berates Nora, calling her a dishonest and immoral woman and telling her that she is unfit to raise their children. He says that from now on their marriage will be only a matter of appearances.

A maid enters, delivering a letter to Nora. The letter is from Krogstad, yet Torvald demands to read the letter and takes it from Nora. Torvald exults that he is saved, as Krogstad has returned the incriminating bond, which Torvald immediately burns along with Krogstad's letters. He takes back his harsh words to his wife and tells her that he forgives her. Nora realizes that her husband is not the strong and gallant man she thought he was and that he truly loves himself more than he does Nora.

Torvald explains that when a man has forgiven his wife, it makes him love her all the more since it reminds him that she is totally dependent on him, like a child. He preserves his peace of mind by thinking of the incident as a mere mistake that she made owing to her foolishness, one of her most endearing feminine traits.

Nora tells Torvald that she is leaving him, and in a confrontational scene expresses her sense of betrayal and disillusionment. She says he has never loved her and they have become strangers to each other. She feels betrayed by his response to the scandal involving Krogstad, and she says she must get away to understand herself. She says that she has been treated like a doll to play with for her whole life, first by her father and then by him. Torvald insists that she fulfill her duty as a wife and mother, but Nora says that she has duties to herself that are just as important, and that she cannot be a good mother or wife without learning to be more than a plaything. She reveals that she had expected that he would want to sacrifice his reputation for hers and that she had planned to kill herself to prevent him from doing so. She now realizes that Torvald is not at all the kind of person she had believed him to be and that their marriage has been based on mutual fantasies and misunderstandings.

Nora leaves her keys and wedding ring; Torvald breaks down and begins to cry, baffled by what has happened. After Nora leaves the room, Torvald, for one second, still has a sense of hope, and exclaims to himself "The most wonderful thing of all—?", just before the door downstairs is heard closing.

Alternative ending
Ibsen's German agent felt that the original ending would not play well in German theatres. In addition, copyright laws of the time would not preserve Ibsen's original work. Therefore, for it to be considered acceptable, and prevent the translator from altering his work, Ibsen was forced to write an alternative ending for the German premiere. In this ending, Nora is led to her children after having argued with Torvald. Seeing them, she collapses, and as the curtain is brought down, it is implied that she stays. Ibsen later called the ending a disgrace to the original play and referred to it as a "barbaric outrage". Virtually all productions today use the original ending, as do nearly all of the film versions of the play.

Composition and publication

Real-life inspiration
A Doll's House was based on the life of Laura Kieler (maiden name Laura Smith Petersen), a good friend of Ibsen. Much that happened between Nora and Torvald happened to Laura and her husband, Victor. Similar to the events in the play, Laura signed an illegal loan to save her husband's life – in this case, to find a cure for his tuberculosis. She wrote to Ibsen, asking for his recommendation of her work to his publisher, thinking that the sales of her book would repay her debt. At his refusal, she forged a check for the money. At this point she was found out. In real life, when Victor discovered about Laura's secret loan, he divorced her and had her committed to an asylum. Two years later, she returned to her husband and children at his urging, and she went on to become a well-known Danish author, living to the age of 83.

Ibsen wrote A Doll's House when Laura Kieler had been committed to the asylum. The fate of this friend of the family shook him deeply, perhaps also because Laura had asked him to intervene at a crucial point in the scandal, which he did not feel able or willing to do. Instead, he turned this life situation into an aesthetically shaped, successful drama. In the play, Nora leaves Torvald with head held high, though facing an uncertain future given the limitations single women faced in the society of the time.

Kieler eventually rebounded from the shame of the scandal and had her own successful writing career while remaining discontented with sole recognition as "Ibsen's Nora" years afterwards.

Composition
Ibsen started thinking about the play around May 1878, although he did not begin its first draft until a year later, having reflected on the themes and characters in the intervening period (he visualised its protagonist, Nora, for instance, as having approached him one day wearing "a blue woolen dress"). He outlined his conception of the play as a "modern tragedy" in a note written in Rome on 19 October 1878. "A woman cannot be herself in modern society," he argues, since it is "an exclusively male society, with laws made by men and with prosecutors and judges who assess feminine conduct from a masculine standpoint!"

Publication
Ibsen sent a fair copy of the completed play to his publisher on 15 September 1879. It was first published in Copenhagen on 4 December 1879, in an edition of 8,000 copies that sold out within a month; a second edition of 3,000 copies followed on 4 January 1880, and a third edition of 2,500 was issued on 8 March.

Production history
A Doll's House received its world premiere on 21 December 1879 at the Royal Theatre in Copenhagen, with Betty Hennings as Nora, Emil Poulsen as Torvald, and Peter Jerndorff as Dr. Rank. Writing for the Norwegian newspaper Folkets Avis, the critic Erik Bøgh admired Ibsen's originality and technical mastery: "Not a single declamatory phrase, no high dramatics, no drop of blood, not even a tear." Every performance of its run was sold out. Another production opened at the Royal Theatre in Stockholm, on 8 January 1880, while productions in Christiania (with Johanne Juell as Nora and Arnoldus Reimers as Torvald) and Bergen followed shortly after.

In Germany, the actress Hedwig Niemann-Raabe refused to perform the play as written, declaring, "I would never leave my children!" Since the playwright's wishes were not protected by copyright, Ibsen decided to avoid the danger of being rewritten by a lesser dramatist by committing what he called a "barbaric outrage" on his play himself and giving it an alternative ending in which Nora did not leave. A production of this version opened in Flensburg in February 1880. This version was also played in Hamburg, Dresden, Hanover, and Berlin, although, in the wake of protests and a lack of success, Niemann-Raabe eventually restored the original ending. Another production of the original version, some rehearsals of which Ibsen attended, opened on 3 March 1880 at the Residenz Theatre in Munich.

In Great Britain, the only way in which the play was initially allowed to be given in London was in an adaptation by Henry Arthur Jones and Henry Herman called Breaking a Butterfly. This adaptation was produced at the Princess Theatre, 3 March 1884. Writing in 1896 in his book The Foundations of a National Drama, Jones says: "A rough translation from the German version of A Doll's House was put into my hands, and I was told that if it could be turned into a sympathetic play, a ready opening would be found for it on the London boards. I knew nothing of Ibsen, but I knew a great deal of Robertson and H. J. Byron. From these circumstances came the adaptation called Breaking a Butterfly." H.L. Mencken writes that it was A Doll's House "denaturized and dephlogisticated. … Toward the middle of the action Ibsen was thrown to the fishes, and Nora was saved from suicide, rebellion, flight and immorality by making a faithful old clerk steal her fateful promissory note from Krogstad's desk. … The curtain fell upon a happy home."

Before 1899 there were two private productions of the play in London (in its original form as Ibsen wrote it)  — one featured George Bernard Shaw in the role of Krogstad. The first public British production of the play in its regular form opened on 7 June 1889 at the Novelty Theatre, starring Janet Achurch as Nora and Charles Charrington as Torvald. Achurch played Nora again for a 7-day run in 1897. Soon after its London premiere, Achurch brought the play to Australia in 1889.

The play was first seen in America in 1883 in Louisville, Kentucky; Helena Modjeska acted Nora. The play made its Broadway premiere at the Palmer's Theatre on 21 December 1889, starring Beatrice Cameron as Nora Helmer. It was first performed in France in 1894. Other productions in the United States include one in 1902 starring Minnie Maddern Fiske, a 1937 adaptation with acting script by Thornton Wilder and starring Ruth Gordon, and a 1971 production starring Claire Bloom.

A new translation by Zinnie Harris at the Donmar Warehouse, starring Gillian Anderson, Toby Stephens, Anton Lesser, Tara FitzGerald and Christopher Eccleston opened in May 2009.

The play was performed by 24/6: A Jewish Theater Company in March 2011, one of their early performances following their December 2010 lower Manhattan launch.

In August 2013, Young Vic, London, Great Britain, produced a new adaptation of A Doll's House directed by Carrie Cracknell based on the English language version by Simon Stephens. In September 2014, in partnership with Brisbane Festival, La Boite located in Brisbane, Australia, hosted an adaptation of A Doll's House written by Lally Katz and directed by Stephen Mitchell Wright. In June 2015, Space Arts Centre in London staged an adaptation of A Doll's House featuring the discarded alternate ending. 'Manaveli' Toronto staged a Tamil version of A Doll's House (ஒரு பொம்மையின் வீடு) on 30 June 2018, translated and directed by Mr P Vikneswaran. The drama was very well received by the Tamil Community in Toronto and was staged again a few months later. The same stage play was filmed at the beginning of 2019 and screened in Toronto on 4 May 2019. The film was received with very good reviews and the artists were hailed for their performance. Arrangements were made to screen the film, ஒரு பொம்மையின் வீடு, in London, at Safari Cinema Harrow, on 7 July 2019. From September 2019 to October 2019 the Lyric Hammersmith in London hosted a new adaptation of the play by Tanika Gupta who moved the setting of the play to colonial India. Though the plot largely remained unchanged, the protagonists were renamed Tom and Niru Helmer and a conversation was added regarding the British oppression of the Indian public. One significant shift was the lack of a slamming door at the end of the play. They also published a pack of teaching materials which includes extracts from the adapted play script.

A production of A Doll's House by The Jamie Lloyd Company starring Jessica Chastain was scheduled to play at the Playhouse Theatre in London in the summer of 2020. Due to the COVID-19 pandemic, the play was postponed to a later date. In November 2022, it was announced that the production would instead premiere on Broadway at the Hudson Theatre. It began previews on February 13, 2023 and will officially open on March 9. It is set to star Jessica Chastain, Arian Moayed, Michael Patrick Thornton, and Okieriete Onaodowan.

Analysis and criticism

A Doll's House questions the traditional roles of men and women in 19th-century marriage. To many 19th-century Europeans, this was scandalous. The covenant of marriage was considered holy, and to portray it as Ibsen did was controversial. However, the Irish playwright George Bernard Shaw found Ibsen's willingness to examine society without prejudice exhilarating.

The Swedish playwright August Strindberg criticised the play in his volume of essays and short stories Getting Married (1884). Strindberg questioned Nora's walking out and leaving her children behind with a man that she herself disapproved of so much that she would not remain with him. Strindberg also considers that Nora's involvement with an illegal financial fraud that involved Nora forging a signature, all done behind her husband's back, and then Nora's lying to her husband regarding Krogstad's blackmail, are serious crimes that should raise questions at the end of the play, when Nora is moralistically judging her husband. And Strindberg points out that Nora's complaint that she and Torvald "have never exchanged one serious word about serious things," is contradicted by the discussions that occur in act one and two.

The reasons Nora leaves her husband are complex, and various details are hinted at throughout the play.  In the last scene, she tells her husband she has been "greatly wronged" by his disparaging and condescending treatment of her, and his attitude towards her in their marriage – as though she were his "doll wife" — and the children in turn have become her "dolls," leading her to doubt her own qualifications to raise her children. She is troubled by her husband's behavior in regard to the scandal of the loaned money. She does not love her husband, she feels they are strangers, she feels completely confused, and suggests that her issues are shared by many women. George Bernard Shaw suggests that she left to begin "a journey in search of self-respect and apprenticeship to life," and that her revolt is "the end of a chapter of human history."

Ibsen was inspired by the belief that "a woman cannot be herself in modern society," since it is "an exclusively male society, with laws made by men and with prosecutors and judges who assess feminine conduct from a masculine standpoint." Its ideas can also be seen as having a wider application: Michael Meyer argued that the play's theme is not women's rights, but rather "the need of every individual to find out the kind of person he or she really is and to strive to become that person." In a speech given to the Norwegian Association for Women's Rights in 1898, Ibsen insisted that he "must disclaim the honor of having consciously worked for the women's rights movement," since he wrote "without any conscious thought of making propaganda," his task having been "the description of humanity." However, the play is associated with feminism, as Miriam Schneir includes it in her anthology Feminism: The Essential Historical Writings, labelling it as one of the essential feminist works.

Because of the departure from traditional behavior and theatrical convention involved in Nora's leaving home, her act of slamming the door as she leaves has come to represent the play itself. In Iconoclasts (1905), James Huneker noted "That slammed door reverberated across the roof of the world."

Adaptations

Film
A Doll's House has been adapted for the cinema on many occasions, including:
 The 1922 lost silent film A Doll's House starring Alla Nazimova as Nora.
 The 1923 German silent film Nora directed by Berthold Viertel. Nora was played by Olga Chekhova, who was born Olga Knipper, and was the niece and namesake of Anton Chekhov’s wife.  She was also Mikhail Chekhov's wife.
The 1943 Argentine film Casa de muñecas starring Delia Garcés, which modernizes the story and uses the alternative ending.
The 1944 German film Nora directed by Harald Braun which retells the story in line with Nazi ideology on the place of women, resolving it with Nora in the home. 
The 1954 Mexican film Casa de muñecas, directed by Alfredo B. Crevenna and starring Marga López, Ernesto Alonso and Miguel Torruco, sets the story in modern-day Mexico, adds a flashback framing device, turns Dr. Rank (renamed Dr. Eduardo Anguiano and played by Alonso, who gets second billing) into Nora's doomed suitor and savior, changes Nora's motivation for leaving her house, and adds a happy ending the following Christmas Eve. 
Two film versions were released in 1973: A Doll's House directed by Joseph Losey starring Jane Fonda, David Warner and Trevor Howard; and A Doll's House directed by Patrick Garland starring Claire Bloom, Anthony Hopkins, and Ralph Richardson.
 Dariush Mehrjui's 1992 film Sara is based on A Doll's House, with the plot transferred to Iran. Sara, played by Niki Karimi, is the Nora of Ibsen's play.
 In 2012, the Young Vic theatre in London released a short film titled Nora with Hattie Morahan portraying what a modern-day Nora might look like.
 In 2016, there were plans for a modernized adaptation starring Ben Kingsley as Doctor Rank and Michele Martin as Nora.

Television
 The 1959 adaptation was a live version for American TV directed by George Schaefer. This version featured Julie Harris, Christopher Plummer, Hume Cronyn, Eileen Heckart and Jason Robards.
 In 1973, Norwegian TV produced an adaptation of A Doll's House titled Et dukkehjem directed by Arild Brinchmann and starring Lise Fjeldstad as Nora Helmer. 
 A 1974 West German television adaptation titled  was directed by Rainer Werner Fassbinder and starred Margit Carstensen in the title role.
 In 1992, David Thacker directed a British television adaptation with Juliet Stevenson, Trevor Eve and David Calder.

Radio
 A Lux Radio Theatre production on 6 June 1938 starred Joan Crawford as Nora and Basil Rathbone as Torvald.
 A later version by the Theatre Guild on the Air on 19 January 1947 featured Rathbone again as Torvald with Dorothy McGuire as Nora.
 In 2012, BBC Radio 3 broadcast an adaptation by Tanika Gupta transposing the setting to India in 1879, where Nora (renamed 'Niru') is an Indian woman married to Torvald (renamed 'Tom'), an English man working for the British Colonial Administration in Calcutta. This production starred Indira Varma as Niru and Toby Stephens as Tom.

Re-staging
 In 1989, film and stage director Ingmar Bergman staged and published a shortened reworking of the play, now entitled Nora, which entirely omitted the characters of the servants and the children, focusing more on the power struggle between Nora and Torvald. It was widely viewed as downplaying the feminist themes of Ibsen's original. The first staging of it in New York was reviewed by the Times as heightening the play's melodramatic aspects. The Los Angeles Times stated that "Nora shores up A Doll's House in some areas but weakens it in others."
 Lucas Hnath wrote A Doll's House, Part 2 as a follow-up about Nora 15 years later.
 In 2017, performance artist Cherdonna Shinatra wrote and starred in a reworking of the play titled "Cherdonna's Doll House" under the direction of Ali Mohamed el-Gasseir. The production was staged at 12th Avenue Arts through Washington Ensemble Theatre. Brendan Kiley of The Seattle Times described it as a "triple-decker satire" in which "Cherdonna’s version of Ibsen’s play about femininity turns into a kind of memoir about Kuehner’s neither-here-nor-there career identity."   
 The Citizens' Theatre in Glasgow have performed Nora: A Doll's House by Stef Smith, a radical re-working of the play, with three actors playing Nora, simultaneously taking place in 1918, 1968 and 2018. The production later transferred to the Young Vic in London.
 Dottok-e-Log (Doll's House), adapted and directed by Kashif Hussain, was performed in the Balochi language at the National Academy of Performing Arts on 30 and 31 March 2019.

Novels 
 In 2019, memoirist, journalist and professor Wendy Swallow published Searching for Nora: After the Doll's House. Swallow's historical novel tells the story of Nora Helmer's life from the moment in December 1879 that Nora walks out on her husband and young children at the close of A Doll's House. Swallow draws from her research into Ibsen's play and iconic protagonist, the realities of the time, and the 19th-century Norwegian emigration to America, following Nora as she first struggles to survive in Kristiania (today's Oslo) and then travels by boat, train and wagon to a new home in the western prairie of Minnesota.

Dance 
 Stina Quagebeur's ballet Nora for the English National Ballet premiered in 2019, with Crystal Costa as Nora and Jeffrey Cirio as Torvald, set to Philip Glass's Tirol Concerto for Piano and Orchestra.

Citations

General and cited sources 
 
 Dukore, Bernard F., ed. 1974. Dramatic Theory and Criticism: Greeks to Grotowski. Florence, KY: Heinle & Heinle. .

Further reading
 Ibsen, Henrick (trans. McLeish). A Doll's House, Nick Hern Books, London, 1994
 Merriam, Eve. After Nora Slammed the Door: From Doll's House to Paper Doll Lives? Merriam Looks at the "Women's Revolution" in America. World Publishing Company, Cleveland, 1964.
 Unwin, Stephen. Ibsen's A Doll's House (Page to Stage Study Guide). Nick Hern Books, London, 1997
 William L. Urban. "Parallels in A Doll's House. Festschrift in Honor of Charles Speel. Ed. by Thomas J. Sienkewicz and James E. Betts. Monmouth College, Monmouth, Illinois, 1997.

External links

 Texts and other resources at the National Library of Norway
 
 
 A Doll's House at the Internet Movie Database
 A Doll’s House: A Study Guide
 
 
  (alternate edition)
 
 The Social Significance of the Modern Drama, a book by Emma Goldman, contains a chapter on A Doll's House.
 1946 Theatre Guild on the Air radio adaptation at Internet Archive

1879 plays
Plays by Henrik Ibsen
Plays about families
Plays set in the 19th century
Memory of the World Register
Norwegian plays adapted into films
West End plays
Broadway plays
Off-Broadway plays
Drama Desk Award-winning plays
Tony Award-winning plays
Tragedy plays